Rene Hiddink (born 19 June 1955 in Heerenveen) is a Dutch retired footballer who now works as assistant coach of the Maldives national football team. Besides the Netherlands, he has managed in Rwanda, Madagascar, and the Maldives.

Football career
Hiddink started his senior career with SC Varsseveld. In 1976, he signed for De Graafschap in the Dutch Eredivisie, where he made over seven league appearances and scored one goal.

References

External links 
 Rene Hiddink has been reunited with Brandts in Kigali 
 René Hiddink often spent time in barracks in Rwanda 
 "New Neymar in Madagascar" 
 Guus Hiddink's brother is stuck in the Maldives
 René Hiddink has nowhere to go in the Maldives

1955 births
Dutch footballers
Living people
Dutch football managers
De Graafschap players
Association footballers not categorized by position